Karah Borni Mosque, was a Tunisian mosque located in the medina of Tunis.
It does not exist anymore.

Localization
The mosque was located in Sidi El Agha Street.

Etymology
The word Borni means black in Turkish while Karah means Hawk.

History
According to the observers, the mosque was built during the Ottoman reign.

References 

Mosques in Tunis